Hamilton MacFadden (April 26, 1901 – January 1, 1977) was an American actor, screenwriter and film director.

MacFadden's parents were Rev. Robert A. MacFadden and Edith Hamilton MacFadden. His father died in 1909, leaving his mother to support herself and four children. In 1928, she became the first woman to file papers to run for governor of Massachusetts.

MacFadden was a 1925 graduate of Harvard University. Soon after graduating, he became producer of the American Theatre Company, which presented plays for 10 weeks in the Boston area. The project was backed by Michael Strange, a writer who made her professional stage debut in the productions. He also served as director of the Community Arts Association in Santa Barbara, California, and the Theatre Guild School of Acting in New York.

After starting out on Broadway in the 1920s, he moved into filmmaking in Hollywood. During the early 1930s he was a contract director at Fox. McFadden made a number of films for them including several early entries in the Charlie Chan series such as Charlie Chan Carries On (1931). He was released from his Fox contract following the 1934 merger with Twentieth Century Pictures. Thereafter he mixed occasional directing jobs with a number of small supporting appearances in films.

Selected filmography

Director
 Harmony at Home (1930)
 Crazy That Way (1930)
 Oh, For a Man! (1930)
 Are You There? (1930)
 Charlie Chan Carries On (1931)
 The Black Camel (1931) 
 Riders of the Purple Sage (1931)
 Charlie Chan's Greatest Case (1933)
 As Husbands Go (1934)
 Stand Up and Cheer! (1934)
 Sea Racketeers (1937)
 The Legion of Missing Men (1937)
 Escape by Night (1937)
 It Can't Last Forever (1937)
 Inside the Law (1942)

Actor

 The Black Camel (1931) - Val Martino (uncredited)
 Keep Smiling (1938) - Director (uncredited)
 Time Out for Murder (1938) - One of the Reporters (uncredited)
 Touchdown, Army (1938) - Coach Shelby (uncredited)
 Five of a Kind (1938) - Andrew Gordon
 Tarnished Angel (1938) - Reverend Summers
 Sharpshooters (1938) - Bowman
 While New York Sleeps (1938) - Pete - Reporter (uncredited)
 Pardon Our Nerve (1939) - Announcer (uncredited)
 Unmarried (1939) - Assistant Coach (uncredited)
 Charlie Chan in Reno (1939) - Night Clerk
 The Jones Family in Hollywood (1939) - Townsend - Director
 Chicken Wagon Family (1939) - Auctioneer
 Shooting High (1940) - J. Wallace Rutledge
 The Lady in Question (1940) - Guard (uncredited)
 Pier 13 (1940) - Reporter (uncredited)
 Yesterday's Heroes (1940) - Reporter (uncredited)
 Michael Shayne, Private Detective (1940) - Reporter (uncredited)
 The Reluctant Dragon (1941) - Himself
 Ride, Kelly, Ride (1941) - Race Track Steward
 Sleepers West (1941) - Conductor Meyers
 Dressed to Kill (1941) - Reporter
 Charlie Chan in Rio (1941) - Bill Kellogg
 Young America (1942) - Jim Benson
 Wilson (1944) - Minor Role (uncredited) (final film role)

References

External links 
 

1901 births
1977 deaths
American male screenwriters
American male film actors
American film directors
Male actors from Boston
20th-century American male actors
Writers from Boston
Screenwriters from Massachusetts
Harvard University alumni
20th-century American male writers
20th-century American screenwriters